The 2005–06 Washington Capitals season was the Washington Capitals 32nd season in the National Hockey League (NHL). The Capitals missed the playoffs for the second season in a row.

Following the 2004–05 NHL lockout, Alexander Ovechkin played his first game with the Washington Capitals on October 5, 2005, scoring two goals in a 3–2 victory over the Columbus Blue Jackets. In a shootout against the Mighty Ducks of Anaheim, Ovechkin scored the game-winning goal in a 5–4 win. The Capitals finished the 2005–06 season in fifth and last place of the Southeast Division with a 29–41–12 campaign, having 12 more points than the 2003–04 season, good for 27th out of the 30 NHL teams. Yet the team played close in every game, playing in 42 one-goal games, although losing two-thirds of those games. A notable first was that Washington area native Jeff Halpern was named captain of the hometown Capitals. At the 2006 trade deadline, March 9, Witt was traded to the Nashville Predators. Several Capitals achieved career highs in several offensive categories, including Matt Pettinger and Dainius Zubrus, who both achieved career highs in all offensive categories. Jeff Halpern set a new career high in assists for the second consecutive season.

Off-season

Regular season
Many longtime Capitals had career years, with Dainius Zubrus netting 57 points, Halpern having a career-best 33 assists, Matt Pettinger putting in a career-best 20-goal, 38-point effort and seven others on the relatively young team topping 20 points for the first time. Two notable landmarks were also hit by Capitals, as the team's longest tenured Capital, Olaf Kolzig, won his 250th game in goal and Andrew Cassels became the 204th player to play 1,000 games, although he did not finish out his season with the team.
 November 22, 2005 – Sidney Crosby and Alexander Ovechkin face each other for the first time
 On January 13, 2006 in Anaheim, Ovechkin scored his first career hat trick against the Mighty Ducks of Anaheim to help Washington win the game. His hat trick goals went past Jean-Sebastien Giguere for his first ever hat trick game.
 January 29, 2006 – Dainius Zubrus scored the Game Winning Goal in a 2–1 victory for the Capitals.
 April 1, 2006 – Brent Johnson earned a shutout in a 1–0 victory over the Ottawa Senators.
 April 7, 2006 – In a game against the Carolina Hurricanes, Olaf Kolzig played his 600th game as a Washington Capitals.
 April 13, 2006 – Alexander Ovechkin becomes the second rookie in history to record 50 goals and 100 points in a season. Teemu Selanne was the first rookie to reach the accomplishment.

The Capitals were the most penalized team during the regular season, with 550 power-play opportunities against. They also allowed the most power-play goals, with 116, and the most short-handed goals, with 18.

Alexander Ovechkin
Ovechkin's rookie season exceeded the hype, as he led all 2005-06 NHL rookies in goals, points, power-play goals and shots. He finished third overall in the NHL in scoring and tied for third in goals; and his 425 shots not only led the league, but also set an NHL rookie record and was the fourth-highest total in NHL history. Ovechkin's rookie point total was the second-best in Washington Capitals history, and his goal total was tied for third in franchise history. He had 21 power play goals and a plus-minus rating of plus 2. Ovechkin won the Calder Memorial Trophy, beating out Pittsburgh center Sidney Crosby and Calgary Flames defenseman Dion Phaneuf.

Final standings

Schedule and results

|- align="center" bgcolor="#CCFFCC"
|1||W||October 5, 2005||3–2 || align="left"|  Columbus Blue Jackets (2005–06) ||1–0–0 || 
|- align="center" bgcolor="#FFBBBB"
|2||L||October 7, 2005||3–7 || align="left"|  Atlanta Thrashers (2005–06) ||1–1–0 || 
|- align="center" bgcolor="#FFBBBB"
|3||L||October 8, 2005||1–8 || align="left"| @ Atlanta Thrashers (2005–06) ||1–2–0 || 
|- align="center" bgcolor="#CCFFCC"
|4||L||October 10, 2005||2–3 || align="left"|  New York Rangers (2005–06) ||2–2–0 || 
|- align="center" bgcolor="#FFBBBB"
|5||L||October 12, 2005||2–7 || align="left"| @ Carolina Hurricanes (2005–06) ||2–3–0 || 
|- align="center" bgcolor="#FFBBBB"
|6||L||October 13, 2005||3–5 || align="left"|  New York Islanders (2005–06) ||2–4–0 || 
|- align="center" bgcolor="#CCFFCC"
|7||W||October 16, 2005||3–2 SO|| align="left"|  Tampa Bay Lightning (2005–06) ||3–4–0 || 
|- align="center" bgcolor="#FFBBBB"
|8||L||October 20, 2005||2–3 || align="left"| @ Florida Panthers (2005–06) ||3–5–0 || 
|- align="center" bgcolor="#FFBBBB"
|9||L||October 22, 2005||0–4 || align="left"|  Carolina Hurricanes (2005–06) ||3–6–0 || 
|- align="center" bgcolor="#CCFFCC"
|10||W||October 26, 2005||3–2 || align="left"| @ Buffalo Sabres (2005–06) ||4–6–0 || 
|- align="center" bgcolor="#FFBBBB"
|11||L||October 28, 2005||2–4 || align="left"| @ Tampa Bay Lightning (2005–06) ||4–7–0 || 
|-

|- align="center" bgcolor="#FFBBBB"
|12||L||November 3, 2005||1–8 || align="left"| @ Philadelphia Flyers (2005–06) ||4–8–0 || 
|- align="center" bgcolor="#CCFFCC"
|13||W||November 4, 2005||3–2 SO|| align="left"|  Atlanta Thrashers (2005–06) ||5–8–0 || 
|- align="center" bgcolor="#CCFFCC"
|14||W||November 6, 2005||5–4 || align="left"|  Toronto Maple Leafs (2005–06) ||6–8–0 || 
|- align="center" bgcolor="#FFBBBB"
|15||L||November 8, 2005||4–6 || align="left"| @ Toronto Maple Leafs (2005–06) ||6–9–0 || 
|- align="center" bgcolor="#FFBBBB"
|16||L||November 11, 2005||3–4 || align="left"|  New Jersey Devils (2005–06) ||6–10–0 || 
|- align="center" bgcolor="#FFBBBB"
|17||L||November 12, 2005||2–3 || align="left"| @ New Jersey Devils (2005–06) ||6–11–0 || 
|- align="center" bgcolor="#CCFFCC"
|18||W||November 15, 2005||4–3 SO|| align="left"|  Tampa Bay Lightning (2005–06) ||7–11–0 || 
|- align="center" bgcolor="#FFBBBB"
|19||L||November 17, 2005||5–8 || align="left"| @ Buffalo Sabres (2005–06) ||7–12–0 || 
|- align="center" bgcolor="#CCFFCC"
|20||W||November 19, 2005||5–1 || align="left"| @ Montreal Canadiens (2005–06) ||8–12–0 || 
|- align="center" bgcolor="#FFBBBB"
|21||L||November 22, 2005||4–5 || align="left"| @ Pittsburgh Penguins (2005–06) ||8–13–0 || 
|- align="center"
|22||L||November 23, 2005||3–4 SO|| align="left"|  Tampa Bay Lightning (2005–06) ||8–13–1 || 
|- align="center"
|23||L||November 26, 2005||2–3 SO|| align="left"| @ New York Rangers (2005–06) ||8–13–2 || 
|- align="center" bgcolor="#FFBBBB"
|24||L||November 27, 2005||2–3 || align="left"|  Buffalo Sabres (2005–06) ||8–14–2 || 
|-

|- align="center" bgcolor="#FFBBBB"
|25||L||December 1, 2005||2–3 || align="left"| @ Florida Panthers (2005–06) ||8–15–2 || 
|- align="center" bgcolor="#CCFFCC"
|26||W||December 3, 2005||5–1 || align="left"|  New York Rangers (2005–06) ||9–15–2 || 
|- align="center" bgcolor="#FFBBBB"
|27||L||December 7, 2005||2–5 || align="left"|  Nashville Predators (2005–06) ||9–16–2 || 
|- align="center" bgcolor="#FFBBBB"
|28||L||December 9, 2005||3–4 || align="left"|  Detroit Red Wings (2005–06) ||9–17–2 || 
|- align="center" bgcolor="#CCFFCC"
|29||W||December 14, 2005||3–2 || align="left"| @ Los Angeles Kings (2005–06) ||10–17–2 || 
|- align="center" bgcolor="#FFBBBB"
|30||L||December 16, 2005||1–4 || align="left"| @ San Jose Sharks (2005–06) ||10–18–2 || 
|- align="center" bgcolor="#FFBBBB"
|31||L||December 18, 2005||2–3 || align="left"|  Florida Panthers (2005–06) ||10–19–2 || 
|- align="center" bgcolor="#CCFFCC"
|32||W||December 22, 2005||6–5 SO|| align="left"| @ Atlanta Thrashers (2005–06) ||11–19–2 || 
|- align="center" bgcolor="#CCFFCC"
|33||W||December 23, 2005||4–2 || align="left"|  Montreal Canadiens (2005–06) ||12–19–2 || 
|- align="center"
|34||L||December 27, 2005||3–4 OT|| align="left"|  Boston Bruins (2005–06) ||12–19–3 || 
|- align="center" bgcolor="#FFBBBB"
|35||L||December 28, 2005||2–7 || align="left"| @ New Jersey Devils (2005–06) ||12–20–3 || 
|- align="center" bgcolor="#CCFFCC"
|36||W||December 31, 2005||4–3 SO|| align="left"|  Philadelphia Flyers (2005–06) ||13–20–3 || 
|-

|- align="center" bgcolor="#FFBBBB"
|37||L||January 1, 2006||2–5 || align="left"|  Atlanta Thrashers (2005–06) ||13–21–3 || 
|- align="center" bgcolor="#FFBBBB"
|38||L||January 4, 2006||1–3 || align="left"|  Ottawa Senators (2005–06) ||13–22–3 || 
|- align="center" bgcolor="#FFBBBB"
|39||L||January 6, 2006||1–3 || align="left"|  Philadelphia Flyers (2005–06) ||13–23–3 || 
|- align="center"
|40||L||January 8, 2006||3–4 SO|| align="left"|  Florida Panthers (2005–06) ||13–23–4 || 
|- align="center"
|41||L||January 10, 2006||3–4 OT|| align="left"|  Chicago Blackhawks (2005–06) ||13–23–5 || 
|- align="center" bgcolor="#FFBBBB"
|42||L||January 12, 2006||1–4 || align="left"| @ Dallas Stars (2005–06) ||13–24–5 || 
|- align="center" bgcolor="#CCFFCC"
|43||W||January 13, 2006||3–2 OT|| align="left"| @ Mighty Ducks of Anaheim (2005–06) ||14–24–5 || 
|- align="center" bgcolor="#CCFFCC"
|44||W||January 16, 2006||6–1 || align="left"| @ Phoenix Coyotes (2005–06) ||15–24–5 || 
|- align="center" bgcolor="#CCFFCC"
|45||W||January 19, 2006||5–4 SO|| align="left"|  St. Louis Blues (2005–06) ||16–24–5 || 
|- align="center" bgcolor="#CCFFCC"
|46||W||January 21, 2006||5–2 || align="left"|  Carolina Hurricanes (2005–06) ||17–24–5 || 
|- align="center" bgcolor="#FFBBBB"
|47||L||January 23, 2006||2–3 || align="left"|  Boston Bruins (2005–06) ||17–25–5 || 
|- align="center" bgcolor="#FFBBBB"
|48||L||January 25, 2006||1–8 || align="left"| @ Pittsburgh Penguins (2005–06) ||17–26–5 || 
|- align="center" bgcolor="#FFBBBB"
|49||L||January 26, 2006||2–3 || align="left"| @ Boston Bruins (2005–06) ||17–27–5 || 
|- align="center" bgcolor="#CCFFCC"
|50||W||January 29, 2006||2–1 || align="left"|  Tampa Bay Lightning (2005–06) ||18–27–5 || 
|- align="center" bgcolor="#FFBBBB"
|51||L||January 31, 2006||3–5 || align="left"| @ New York Islanders (2005–06) ||18–28–5 || 
|-

|- align="center" bgcolor="#CCFFCC"
|52||W||February 3, 2006||4–1 || align="left"|  Toronto Maple Leafs (2005–06) ||19–28–5 || 
|- align="center" bgcolor="#FFBBBB"
|53||L||February 4, 2006||0–5 || align="left"| @ Tampa Bay Lightning (2005–06) ||19–29–5 || 
|- align="center" bgcolor="#FFBBBB"
|54||L||February 7, 2006||0–5 || align="left"|  Florida Panthers (2005–06) ||19–30–5 || 
|- align="center" bgcolor="#FFBBBB"
|55||L||February 10, 2006||4–5 || align="left"| @ Philadelphia Flyers (2005–06) ||19–31–5 || 
|- align="center" bgcolor="#FFBBBB"
|56||L||February 11, 2006||3–6 || align="left"|  Pittsburgh Penguins (2005–06) ||19–32–5 || 
|- align="center" bgcolor="#CCFFCC"
|57||W||February 28, 2006||5–3 || align="left"| @ Toronto Maple Leafs (2005–06) ||20–32–5 || 
|-

|- align="center" bgcolor="#FFBBBB"
|58||L||March 2, 2006||1–7 || align="left"| @ Ottawa Senators (2005–06) ||20–33–5 || 
|- align="center"
|59||L||March 4, 2006||2–3 OT|| align="left"| @ Atlanta Thrashers (2005–06) ||20–33–6 || 
|- align="center" bgcolor="#CCFFCC"
|60||W||March 6, 2006||5–2 || align="left"|  New York Islanders (2005–06) ||21–33–6 || 
|- align="center" bgcolor="#CCFFCC"
|61||W||March 8, 2006||6–3 || align="left"|  Pittsburgh Penguins (2005–06) ||22–33–6 || 
|- align="center"
|62||L||March 10, 2006||3–4 SO|| align="left"|  New Jersey Devils (2005–06) ||22–33–7 || 
|- align="center" bgcolor="#FFBBBB"
|63||L||March 12, 2006||2–5 || align="left"|  Ottawa Senators (2005–06) ||22–34–7 || 
|- align="center" bgcolor="#FFBBBB"
|64||L||March 14, 2006||4–6 || align="left"|  Buffalo Sabres (2005–06) ||22–35–7 || 
|- align="center" bgcolor="#FFBBBB"
|65||L||March 16, 2006||4–5 || align="left"| @ New York Rangers (2005–06) ||22–36–7 || 
|- align="center"
|66||L||March 18, 2006||3–4 SO|| align="left"|  Florida Panthers (2005–06) ||22–36–8 || 
|- align="center" bgcolor="#FFBBBB"
|67||L||March 20, 2006||2–4 || align="left"|  Montreal Canadiens (2005–06) ||22–37–8 || 
|- align="center" bgcolor="#FFBBBB"
|68||L||March 22, 2006||2–3 || align="left"| @ Florida Panthers (2005–06) ||22–38–8 || 
|- align="center"
|69||L||March 23, 2006||3–4 OT|| align="left"| @ Tampa Bay Lightning (2005–06) ||22–38–9 || 
|- align="center" bgcolor="#CCFFCC"
|70||W||March 25, 2006||3–1 || align="left"| @ Carolina Hurricanes (2005–06) ||23–38–9 || 
|- align="center" bgcolor="#CCFFCC"
|71||W||March 29, 2006||5–1 || align="left"| @ Carolina Hurricanes (2005–06) ||24–38–9 || 
|- align="center"
|72||L||March 30, 2006||2–3 OT|| align="left"| @ Montreal Canadiens (2005–06) ||24–38–10 || 
|-

|- align="center" bgcolor="#CCFFCC"
|73||W||April 1, 2006||1–0 || align="left"| @ Ottawa Senators (2005–06) ||25–38–10 || 
|- align="center"
|74||L||April 3, 2006||5–6 OT|| align="left"| @ Carolina Hurricanes (2005–06) ||25–38–11 || 
|- align="center"
|75||L||April 5, 2006||3–4 SO|| align="left"|  Carolina Hurricanes (2005–06) ||25–38–12 || 
|- align="center" bgcolor="#FFBBBB"
|76||L||April 7, 2006||3–4 || align="left"|  Carolina Hurricanes (2005–06) ||25–39–12 || 
|- align="center" bgcolor="#FFBBBB"
|77||L||April 8, 2006||0–5 || align="left"| @ New York Islanders (2005–06) ||25–40–12 || 
|- align="center" bgcolor="#CCFFCC"
|78||W||April 10, 2006||2–1 OT|| align="left"| @ Boston Bruins (2005–06) ||26–40–12 || 
|- align="center" bgcolor="#FFBBBB"
|79||L||April 13, 2006||3–5 || align="left"| @ Atlanta Thrashers (2005–06) ||26–41–12 || 
|- align="center" bgcolor="#CCFFCC"
|80||W||April 15, 2006||2–1 SO|| align="left"| @ Florida Panthers (2005–06) ||27–41–12 || 
|- align="center" bgcolor="#CCFFCC"
|81||W||April 17, 2006||6–4 || align="left"|  Atlanta Thrashers (2005–06) ||28–41–12 || 
|- align="center" bgcolor="#CCFFCC"
|82||W||April 18, 2006||4–1 || align="left"| @ Tampa Bay Lightning (2005–06) ||29–41–12 || 
|-

|-
| Legend:

Player statistics

Scoring
 Position abbreviations: C = Center; D = Defense; G = Goaltender; LW = Left Wing; RW = Right Wing
  = Joined team via a transaction (e.g., trade, waivers, signing) during the season. Stats reflect time with the Capitals only.
  = Left team via a transaction (e.g., trade, waivers, release) during the season. Stats reflect time with the Capitals only.

Goaltending

Awards and records

Awards

Milestones

Transactions
The Capitals were involved in the following transactions from February 17, 2005, the day after the 2004–05 NHL season was officially cancelled, through June 19, 2006, the day of the deciding game of the 2006 Stanley Cup Finals.

Trades

Players acquired

Players lost

Signings

Draft picks
Washington's draft picks at the 2005 NHL Entry Draft held at the Westin Hotel in Ottawa, Ontario.

Farm teams
 Hershey Bears, American Hockey League
 South Carolina Stingrays, East Coast Hockey League

Notes

References

Wash
Wash
Washington Capitals seasons
Washington Capitals
Washington Capitals